Jack O'Connor may refer to:

Sportspeople
Jack O'Connor (Australian footballer) (1900–1983), Australian footballer
Baseball
Jack O'Connor (catcher) (1866–1937), baseball catcher and manager
Jack O'Connor (pitcher) (born 1958), baseball pitcher
Jack O'Connor (Canadian football), Canadian football player and coach
Cricket
Jack O'Connor (Australian cricketer) (1875–1941), Australian cricketer
Jack O'Connor (English cricketer) (1897–1977), English cricketer
Jack O'Connor (Gaelic footballer) (born 1960), former Kerry player and manager
Hurling
Jack O'Connor (Cork hurler) (born 1998), Irish hurler
Jack O'Connor (Wexford hurler) (born 1995), Irish hurler
Jack O'Connor (rugby union) (1906–1980), rugby union player who represented Australia

Other people
Jack O'Connor (trade unionist) (born 1957), Irish trade union leader
Jack O'Connor (writer) (1902–1978), American author and outdoorsman

See also
John O'Connor (disambiguation)
Jack Connor (disambiguation)
Connor (surname)